Thundercat or Thundercats may refer to:

 Thundercat (snowmobile), a series of snowmobiles produced by Arctic Cat
 Thundercat (musician), stage name of Stephen Lee Bruner, an American musician
 ThunderCats, an American media franchise, featuring a fictional group of catlike humanoid aliens.
 ThunderCats (1985 TV series), the original 1985 television series
 ThunderCats (2011 TV series), the 2011 television series reboot
 ThunderCats Roar, the 2020 television series reboot
 ThunderCats (1987 video game), a 1987 video game
 ThunderCats (2012 video game), a 2012 platform video game
 ThunderCats (comics), a 1980s comic book adaptation
 Tennessee Thundercats, an arena football team now known as the Johnstown Riverhawks
 Yamaha YZF600R, also sold as "Thundercat"